Anastassia Morkovkina (born 6 April 1981) is an Estonian football manager and former professional player. She is currently the manager of the Naiste Meistriliiga club Pärnu JK.

Morkovkina played as a striker for JK Narvane Narva, TKSK and Pärnu JK in the Meistriliiga. She has been named Estonian Female Footballer of the Year in 1996–97, 2000, 2002, 2003, 2004, 2005, 2009, 2010.

She was a member of the Estonian national team since 1997 to 2015, and served as its captain. She leads the team's statistics in scoring.

Morkovkina is the Naiste Meistriliiga all-time top scorer with 773 goals.

Career statistics

Club

Honours

Player
 TKSK
 Estonian Top Division: 1997–98, 1998, 1999
 Pärnu JK
 Estonian Top Division: 2003, 2004, 2005, 2006, 2010, 2011, 2012, 2013, 2014, 2015, 2016, 2017
 Runners Up: 2002, 2007, 2008
 Estonian Cup: 2010, 2011, 2012, 2014, 2015, 2017
 Runners Up: 2008, 2013
 Estonian Women's Supercup: 2011, 2012, 2013, 2014, 2015, 2016, 2017

Individual
 Estonian Female Footballer of the Year: 1996–97, 2000, 2002, 2003, 2004, 2005, 2009, 2010
 Naiste Meistriliiga top goalscorer: 1996–97, 1997–98, 1998, 2000, 2003, 2004, 2005, 2006, 2011, 2012, 2013, 2014, 2015, 2016
 Naiste Meistriliiga Player of the Year: 2012, 2015, 2016

References

1981 births
Living people
Sportspeople from Narva
Estonian women's footballers
Estonia women's international footballers
Estonian people of Russian descent
Women's association football forwards
Pärnu JK players
FC Levadia Tallinn (women) players
Estonia women's national football team managers
Estonian football managers